La Roue Tourangelle is a road bicycle race held annually in the Region Centre-Val de Loire, France. The editions 2002–2004 were reserved for amateurs; from 2005 until 2012, it was organized as a 1.2 event on the UCI Europe Tour; in 2013 it became a 1.1 event, and as of 2015 it became part of the French Road Cycling Cup.

Winners

References

External links

Recurring sporting events established in 2002
2002 establishments in France
UCI Europe Tour races
Cycle races in France